Dilshodbek Umidov  better known simply as D.Ditto, is an Uzbek singer, actor. D.Ditto began his artistic career in 2003. D.Ditto rose to fame in 2004 thanks to the Shoxrux clip "Balanda".  D. Ditto received several awards and nominations, including the Latin M Award, three RizaNova Awards, two NTT Awards, and in 2011, Ditto won the State Award of Fame. D.Ditto became famous in Uzbekistan in 2011 with the song "Ishq" as a singer. 

Since 2012, D.Ditto has written songs in Uzbek, Russian and English languages.

Biography 
Dilshodbek Umirov was born on August 6, 1984, in the Boka district of the Tashkent region in an intellectual family. After graduating from school in 2000, he studied at the Tashkent State Economic Lyceum. In 2003, after graduating from the D. Ditto Economic Lyceum, he entered the Tashkent State University of Economics. However, after graduating from college, he does not work in his field. Because now he was interested in a completely different field, that is, art and sports.

Career 
In 2001, Ditto started his career as a televangelist in nightclubs in Tashkent thanks to jocks. In 2004, Ditto was offered to rapper Shoxrux for his music video called Balanda. In addition, he starred in Shoxrux's video clips "Hyolimdasan" and "April 1 Jokes." His first acting experience was in the 2005 film Fatima and Zuhra. From 2006 to 2008, he played Azamat in the TV series "Aldangan qalb". He also had roles in Super Kelinchak and the Aldanganlar miniseries. In 2009, Webber played the role of the stalker Beck in the Tajik TV series "Muxabbat Asirasi". D.Ditto's role in 23:11, produced by Fruz Muxtor, was his first in Kazakhstan. In 2011, he starred in the drama film "Qasos" together with Ulugʻbek Qodirov. Ditto played the role of a wayward man in the movie “Yondiradi Kuydiradi”. In 2015, Ditto appeared in the role of Dilshod in "Arslon Izidan" directed by Aziz Rametov, along with Ulugʻbek Qodirov, Aziz Rametov, Bekzod Tadjiev and Saida Rametova. He also appeared in the feature film Shuhrat Salomov, directed by “Ziddiyat”.

Filmography

Filmography 
Below, in chronological order, is an ordered list of movies D.Ditto appeared in.

Music videos

References

External links 

1984 births
Living people
Uzbekistani male film actors
21st-century Uzbekistani male actors